Ingar Helge Gimle (born 28 September 1956) is a Norwegian actor.

He was born in Oslo, Norway. He made his stage debut at Trøndelag Teater in 1985, was employed at Oslo Nye Teater from 1989 and the National Theatre of Norway from 1996.

For stage acting he won Komiprisen in 2009 and the Hedda Award in 2013. For screen acting he has won Amanda Awards in 1999, 2010 and 2018.

Filmography

1994: Ti kniver i hjertet
1998. Hotel Cæsar
1999: Absolutt blåmandag
2002: I Am Dina
2002: Folk flest bor i Kina
2006: Etaten
2007: Tatt av Kvinnen
2008: Ulvenatten
2011: Kong Curling
2012: Dead Snow: Red vs. Dead
2014: Dawn

References

1956 births
Living people
Male actors from Oslo
20th-century Norwegian male actors
21st-century Norwegian male actors